The Catholic Church in Antigua and Barbuda is part of the worldwide Catholic Church in communion with the Bishop of Rome, the Pope.

Territorial organization

The only ecclesiastical jurisdiction in this island state is the Diocese of Saint John's - Basseterre, suffragan of Archdiocese of Castries. The Catholic population is about 6,930 people out of a total of 100,000 inhabitants. The bishops of Antigua and Barbuda are part of the Antilles Episcopal Conference.

Apostolic Nunciature

The Apostolic Nuncio of Antigua and Barbuda was established on December 15, 1986 with the Papal brief Ut publica et Ecclesiae of Pope John Paul II.

Nuncios
 Manuel Monteiro de Castro (25 April 1987 - 21 August 1991 appointed apostolic nuncio in El Salvador)
 Eugenio Sbarbaro (7 February 1991 - 26 April 2000 appointed Apostolic Nuncio to Serbia and Montenegro)
 Emil Paul Tscherrig (20 January 2001 - 22 May 2004 appointed Apostolic Nuncio to Korea)
 Thomas Edward Gullickson (20 December 2004 - 21 May 2011 appointed Apostolic Nuncio in Ukraine)
 Nicola Girasoli, from 29 October 2011

See also
Catholic Church by country

References

External links
 AAS 79 (1987), p. 248 Vatican website